Makoci (in Albanian) and Makovac (in Serbian; Маковац) is a village in Kosovo located in the municipality of Pristina and in the District of Pristina. According to the census in 2011, it had 997 inhabitants, all of whom were Albanians.

Demographics 
In 2011 census, the village had in total 997 inhabitants, from whom all were Albanians.

Notes

References 

Villages in Pristina